Caryocolum cassella is a moth of the family Gelechiidae. It is found in the France, Germany, Austria, Switzerland, Denmark, Scandinavia, Poland, the Czech Republic, Slovakia, Romania, Estonia, Lithuania, Ukraine, Belarus and Russia. It is also found in North America, where it has been recorded from Alberta, Saskatchewan, California and Nevada. A record from Hokkaido, Japan might also refer to this species.

The length of the forewings is 5.5-6.5 mm for males and 5.5–6 mm for females. The forewings are light to dark brown mottled with orange-brown. Adults have been recorded on wing from June to late August.

The larvae feed on Stellaria nemorum. They feed between spun shoots. Larvae can be found from May to June.

References

Moths described in 1864
cassella
Moths of Europe
Moths of Asia
Moths of North America